Thanet Wanderers RUFC was founded in 1886, and are based in Broadstairs.  They currently play in London and South East Division Two South East.
The club runs 4 senior teams (one being veterans) plus a junior section for boys and girls.

Honors
Kent 1 champions: 1990–91
London 2 South champions: 1996–97
Kent Cup winners: 2000–01
Kent Plate winners (2): 2003–04, 2010–11
London 3 South East champions: 2013–14

References

External links 
Thanet Wanderers RUFC web site

Rugby union in Kent
Broadstairs
Rugby clubs established in 1886
1886 establishments in England